Dian Fossey (January 16, 1932 – ) was an American primatologist and conservationist known for undertaking an extensive study of mountain gorilla groups from 1966 until her murder in 1985. She studied them daily in the mountain forests of Rwanda, initially encouraged to work there by paleoanthropologist Louis Leakey. Gorillas in the Mist, a book published two years before her death, is Fossey's account of her scientific study of the gorillas at Karisoke Research Center and prior career. It was adapted into a 1988 film of the same name.

Fossey was a leading primatologist, and a member of the "Trimates", a group of female scientists recruited by Leakey to study great apes in their natural environments, along with Jane Goodall who studies chimpanzees, and Biruté Galdikas, who studies orangutans.

Fossey spent 20 years in Rwanda, where she supported conservation efforts, strongly opposed poaching and tourism in wildlife habitats, and made more people acknowledge the sapience of gorillas. Following the killing of a gorilla and subsequent tensions, she was murdered in her cabin at a remote camp in Rwanda in December 1985. Although Fossey's American research assistant was convicted in absentia, there is no consensus as to who killed her.

Her research and conservation work helped reduce the downward population trend in mountain gorillas.

Early life
Fossey was born in San Francisco, California, the daughter of Hazel (née Kidd), a fashion model, and George Edward Fossey III, a real estate agent and business owner. Her parents divorced when she was six. Her mother remarried the following year, to businessman Richard Price. Her father tried to keep in contact, but her mother discouraged it, and all contact was subsequently lost. Fossey's stepfather, Richard Price, never treated her as his own child. He would not allow Fossey to sit at the dining room table with him or her mother during dinner. A man adhering to strict discipline, Richard Price offered Fossey little to no emotional support. Although, by 1950, Richard and Hazel would relocate with Dian to Marin County, the same county where her father George Fossey, now married to Mrs. Gladys Bove (née Kohler), resided. (George and Gladys would divorce by 1960. His third and final marriage would be to Kathryn Smith around 1959. Kathryn has mistakenly been cited as Dian's mother over the years.)

Struggling with personal insecurity, Fossey turned to animals as a way to gain acceptance. Her love for animals began with her first pet goldfish and continued throughout her entire life. At age six, she began riding horses, earning a letter from her school; by her graduation in 1954, Fossey had established herself as an equestrienne.

Education and medical career
Fossey attended Lowell High School. Following the guidance of her stepfather, she enrolled in a business course at the College of Marin in San Francisco. However, spending her summer on a ranch in Montana at age 19 rekindled her love of animals, and she enrolled in a pre-veterinary course in biology at the University of California, Davis. In defiance of her stepfather's wishes for her to attend a business school, Fossey decided to spend her professional life working with animals. Consequently, Fossey's parents failed to give her any substantial amount of financial support throughout her adult life. She supported herself by working as a clerk at a White Front department store, doing other clerking and laboratory work, and laboring as a machinist in a factory.

Although Fossey had always been an exemplary student, she had difficulties with basic sciences including chemistry and physics, and failed her second year of the program. She transferred to San Jose State College, where she became a member of Kappa Alpha Theta sorority, to study occupational therapy, receiving her bachelor's degree in 1954. Initially following her college major, Fossey began a career in occupational therapy. She interned at various hospitals in California and worked with tuberculosis patients. Fossey was originally a prizewinning equestrian, which drew her to Kentucky in 1955, and a year later took a job as an occupational therapist at the Kosair Crippled Children's Hospital in Louisville.

Her shy and reserved personality allowed her to work well with the children at the hospital. Fossey became close with her coworker Mary White "Gaynee" Henry, secretary to the hospital's chief administrator and the wife of one of the doctors, Michael J. Henry. The Henrys invited Fossey to join them on their family farm, where she worked with livestock on a daily basis and also experienced an inclusive family atmosphere that had been missing for most of her life. During her free time she would pursue her love of horses.

The Leakeys and the Congo

Journey to Africa

Fossey turned down an offer to join the Henrys on an African tour due to lack of finances, but in 1963 she borrowed $8,000 (one year's salary), took out her life savings and went on a seven-week visit to Africa. In September 1963, she arrived in Nairobi, Kenya. While there, she met actor William Holden, owner of Treetops Hotel, who introduced her to her safari guide, John Alexander. Alexander became her guide for the next seven weeks through Kenya, Tanzania, Democratic Republic of Congo, and Rhodesia, now Zimbabwe. Alexander's route included visits to Tsavo, Africa's largest national park; the saline lake of Manyara, famous for attracting giant flocks of flamingos; and the Ngorongoro Crater, well known for its abundant wildlife. The final two sites for her visit were Olduvai Gorge in Tanzania (the archeological site of Louis and Mary Leakey); and Mt. Mikeno in Congo, where, in 1959, American zoologist George Schaller had carried out a yearlong pioneering study of the mountain gorilla. At Olduvai Gorge, Fossey met the Leakeys while they were examining the area for hominid fossils. Leakey talked to Fossey about the work of English primatologist Jane Goodall and the importance of long-term research on the great apes.

Although Fossey had broken her ankle while visiting the Leakeys, by October 16, she was staying in Walter Baumgartel's small hotel in Uganda, the Travellers Rest. Baumgartel, an advocate of gorilla conservation, was among the first to see the benefits that tourism could bring to the area, and he introduced Fossey to Kenyan wildlife photographers Joan and Alan Root. The couple agreed to allow Fossey and Alexander to camp behind their own camp, and it was during these few days that Fossey first encountered wild mountain gorillas. After staying with friends in Rhodesia, Fossey returned home to Louisville to repay her loans. She published three articles in The Courier-Journal newspaper, detailing her visit to Africa.

Research in the Congo

When Leakey made an appearance in Louisville while on a nationwide lecture tour, Fossey took the color supplements that had appeared about her African trip in The Courier-Journal to show to Leakey, who remembered her and her interest in mountain gorillas. Three years after the original safari, Leakey suggested that Fossey could undertake a long-term study of the gorillas in the same manner as Jane Goodall had with chimpanzees in Tanzania. Leakey lined up funding for Fossey to research mountain gorillas, and Fossey left her job to relocate to Africa.

After studying Swahili and auditing a class on primatology during the eight months it took to get her visa and funding, Fossey arrived in Nairobi in December 1966. With the help of Joan Root and Leakey, Fossey acquired the necessary provisions and an old canvas-topped Land Rover which she named "Lily". On the way to the Congo, Fossey visited the Gombe Stream Research Centre to meet Goodall and observe her research methods with chimpanzees. Accompanied by photographer Alan Root, who helped her obtain work permits for the Virunga Mountains, Fossey began her field study at Kabara, in the Congo in early 1967, in the same meadow where Schaller had made his camp seven years earlier. Root taught her basic gorilla tracking, and his tracker Sanwekwe later helped in Fossey's camp. Living in tents on mainly tinned produce, once a month Fossey would hike down the mountain to "Lily" and make the two-hour drive to the village of Kikumba to restock.

Fossey identified three distinct groups in her study area, but could not get close to them. She eventually found that mimicking their actions and making grunting sounds assured them, together with submissive behavior and eating of the local celery plant. She later attributed her success with habituating gorillas to her experience working as an occupational therapist with children with autism. Like George Schaller, Fossey relied greatly on individual "noseprints" for identification, initially via sketching and later by camera.

Fossey had arrived in the Congo in locally turbulent times. Known as the Belgian Congo until its independence in June 1960, unrest and rebellion plagued the new government until 1965, when Lieutenant General Joseph-Désiré Mobutu, by then commander-in-chief of the national army, seized control of the country and declared himself president for five years during what is now called the Congo Crisis. During the political upheaval, a rebellion and battles took place in the Kivu Province. On July 9, 1967, soldiers arrived at the camp to escort Fossey and her research workers down, and she was detained at Rumangabo for two weeks. Fossey eventually escaped through bribery to Walter Baumgärtel's Travellers Rest Hotel in Kisoro, where her escort was arrested by the Ugandan military.
Advised by the Ugandan authorities not to return to Congo, after meeting Leakey in Nairobi, Fossey agreed with him against US Embassy advice to restart her study on the Rwandan side of the Virungas. In Rwanda, Fossey had met local American expatriate Rosamond Carr, who introduced her to Belgian local Alyette DeMunck; DeMunck had a local's knowledge of Rwanda and offered to find Fossey a suitable site for study.

Conservation work in Rwanda

On September 24, 1967, Fossey founded the Karisoke Research Center, a remote rainforest camp nestled in Ruhengeri province in the saddle of two volcanoes. For the research center's name, Fossey used "Kari" for the first four letters of Mount Karisimbi that overlooked her camp from the south, and "soke" for the last four letters of Mount Bisoke, the slopes of which rose to the north, directly behind camp. Established  up Mount Bisoke, the defined study area covered . She became known by locals as Nyirmachabelli, or Nyiramacibiri, roughly translated as "The woman who lives alone on the mountain."

Unlike the gorillas from the Congo side of the Virungas, the Karisoke area gorillas had never been partially habituated by Schaller's study; they knew humans only as poachers, and it took longer for Fossey to be able to study the Karisoke gorillas at a close distance. Fossey attempted to habituate the gorillas by copying their actions. Over time the gorillas became accustomed to Fossey. As she explained to the BBC in 1984: "I'm an inhibited persona and I felt that the gorillas were somewhat inhibited as well, so I imitated their natural, normal behaviour like feeding, munching on celery stalks or scratching myself."

Fossey made discoveries about gorillas including how females transfer from group to group over the decades, gorilla vocalization, hierarchies and social relationships among groups, rare infanticide, gorilla diet, and how gorillas recycle nutrients. Fossey's research was funded by the Wilkie Foundation and the Leakey Home, with primary funding from the National Geographic Society.

In 1970, she appeared on the cover of National Geographic Magazine, which brought tremendous attention to her work.

Fossey was often hostile to Africans who entered into the protected area, even shooting roaming cattle.

By 1980, Fossey, who had obtained her PhD at Cambridge University in the UK, was recognized as the world's leading authority on the physiology and behavior of mountain gorillas, defining gorillas as being "dignified, highly social, gentle giants, with individual personalities, and strong family relationships." Fossey lectured as professor at Cornell University in 1981–83. Her bestselling book Gorillas in the Mist was praised by Nikolaas Tinbergen, the Dutch ethologist and ornithologist who won the 1973 Nobel Prize in Physiology or Medicine. Her book remains the best-selling book about gorillas.

Many research students left after not being able to cope with the cold, dark, and extremely muddy conditions around Karisoke on the slopes of the Virunga Volcanoes, where paths usually had to be cut through six-foot-tall grass with a machete.

Opposition to poaching
While hunting had been illegal in the national park of the Virunga Volcanoes in Rwanda since the 1920s, the law was rarely enforced by park conservators, who were often bribed by poachers and paid a salary less than Fossey's own African staff. On three occasions, Fossey wrote that she witnessed the aftermath of the capture of infant gorillas at the behest of the park conservators for zoos; since gorillas will fight to the death to protect their young, the kidnappings would often result in up to 10 adult gorillas' deaths. Through the Digit Fund, Fossey financed patrols to destroy poachers' traps in the Karisoke study area. In four months in 1979, the Fossey patrol, consisting of four African staffers, destroyed 987 poachers' traps in the research area's vicinity. The official Rwandan national park guards, consisting of 24 staffers, did not eradicate any poachers' traps during the same period. In the eastern portion of the park not patrolled by Fossey, poachers virtually eradicated all the park's elephants for ivory and killed more than a dozen gorillas.

Fossey helped in the arrest of several poachers, some of whom served prison sentences.

In 1978, Fossey attempted to prevent the export of two young gorillas, Coco and Pucker, from Rwanda to the zoo in Cologne, Germany. During the capture of the infants at the behest of the Cologne Zoo and Rwandan park conservator, 20 adult gorillas had been killed. The infant gorillas were given to Fossey by the park conservator of the Virunga Volcanoes for treatment of injuries suffered during their capture and captivity. With considerable effort, she restored them to a semblance of health. Over Fossey's objections, the gorillas were shipped to Cologne, where they lived nine years in captivity, both dying in the same month. She viewed the holding of animals in "prison" (zoos) for the entertainment of people as unethical.

While gorillas from rival groups on the mountains that were not part of Fossey's study had often been found poached five to ten at a time, and had spurred Fossey to conduct her own anti-poaching patrols, Fossey's study groups had not been direct victims of poaching until Fossey's favorite gorilla, Digit, was killed in 1978. Later that year, the silverback of Digit's Group 4, named for Fossey's Uncle Bert, was shot in the heart while trying to save his son, Kweli, from being seized by poachers cooperating with the Rwandan park conservator. Kweli's mother, Macho, was also killed in the raid, but, as a result of Uncle Bert's intervention, Kweli was not captured; however, three-year-old Kweli died, slowly and painfully, of gangrene, from being brushed by a poacher's bullet.

According to Fossey's letters, ORTPN (the Rwandan national park system), the World Wildlife Fund, African Wildlife Foundation, Fauna Preservation Society, the Mountain Gorilla Project and some of her former students tried to wrest control of the Karisoke research center from her for the purpose of tourism, by portraying her as unstable. In her last two years, Fossey claimed not to have lost any gorillas to poachers; however, the Mountain Gorilla Project, which was supposed to patrol the Mount Sabyinyo area, tried to cover up gorilla deaths caused by poaching and diseases transmitted through tourists. Nevertheless, these organizations received most of the public donations directed toward gorilla conservation. The public often believed their money would go to Fossey, who was struggling to finance her anti-poaching and anti-bushmeat hunting patrols, while organizations collecting in her name put it into tourism projects and, as she put it, "to pay the airfare of so-called conservationists who will never go on anti-poaching patrols in their life." Fossey described the two philosophies as her own "active conservation" or the international conservation groups' "theoretical conservation."

Killing of Digit and escalating tensions

Sometime during the day on New Year's Eve 1977, Fossey's favorite gorilla, Digit, was killed by poachers. As the sentry of study group 4, he defended the group against six poachers and their dogs, who ran across the gorilla study group while checking antelope traplines. Digit took five spear wounds in ferocious self-defense and managed to kill one of the poachers' dogs, allowing the other 13 members of his group to escape. Digit was decapitated, and his hands cut off for ashtrays. He was twelve years old. After his mutilated body was discovered by research assistant Ian Redmond, Fossey's group captured one of the killers. He revealed the names of his five accomplices, three of whom were later imprisoned. Fossey later described Digit's killing as the "saddest event in all my years of sharing the daily lives of mountain gorilla."

The event plunged Fossey into depression. She isolated herself in her cabin, consuming large amounts of alcohol and cigarettes.

Fossey subsequently created the Digit Fund (now the Dian Fossey Gorilla Fund International in the US) to raise money for anti-poaching patrols. In addition, a consortium of international gorilla funds arose to accept donations in light of Digit's death and increased attention on poaching. Fossey mostly opposed the efforts of the international organizations, which she felt inefficiently directed their funds towards more equipment for Rwandan park officials, some of whom were alleged to have ordered some of the gorilla poachings in the first place.

The deaths of some of her most studied gorillas caused Fossey to devote more of her attention to preventing poaching and less on scientific publishing and research. Fossey became more intense in protecting the gorillas and began to employ more direct tactics: she and her staff cut animal traps almost as soon as they were set; frightened, captured and humiliated the poachers; held their cattle for ransom; burnt their hunting camps and even burnt the mats from their houses.

Fossey was reported to have captured and held Rwandans she suspected of poaching. She allegedly beat a poacher's testicles with stinging nettles. In a letter to a friend, she wrote, "We stripped him and spread eagled him and lashed the holy blue sweat out of him with nettle stalks and leaves…" She even reportedly kidnapped and held for ransom the child of a suspected poacher. After her murder, Fossey's National Geographic editor, Mary Smith, told Shlachter that on visits to the United States, Fossey would "load up on firecrackers, cheap toys and magic tricks as part of her method to mystify the (Africans)  in order to hold them at bay." She wore face-masks and pretended to practice black magic to scare away poachers.

Writing in The Wall Street Journal in 2002, the journalist Tunku Varadarajan described Fossey at the end of her life as colorful, controversial, and "a racist alcoholic who regarded her gorillas as better than the African people who lived around them".

Death

Murder

In the early morning of December 27, 1985, Fossey was discovered murdered in the bedroom of her cabin located at the far edge of the camp in the Virunga Mountains, Rwanda. Wayne Richard McGuire, Fossey's last research assistant at Karisoke, was summoned to the scene by Fossey's house servant and found her bludgeoned to death, reporting that "when I reached down to check her vital signs, I saw her face had been split, diagonally, with one machete blow." The cabin was littered with broken glass and overturned furniture, with a 9mm handgun and ammunition beside her on the floor. Her cabin had been ransacked. However, robbery was not believed to be the motive for the crime, as Fossey's valuables were still in the cabin, including her passport, handguns, and thousands of dollars in U.S. bills and traveler's checks.

The last entry in her diary read:

Fossey is buried at Karisoke, in a site that she herself had constructed for her deceased gorilla friends. She was buried in the gorilla graveyard next to Digit, and near many gorillas killed by poachers. Memorial services were also held in New York City, Washington, D.C. and California.

Aftermath
After Fossey's death, her entire staff was arrested. This included Rwandan Emmanuel Rwelekana, a tracker who had been fired from his job after he allegedly tried to kill Fossey with a machete, according to the government's account of McGuire's trial. All were later released, except Rwelekana, who was later found dead in prison, allegedly having hanged himself.

Rwandan courts later tried and convicted Wayne McGuire in absentia for her murder. The alleged motive was that McGuire murdered Fossey in order to steal the manuscript of the sequel to her 1983 book, Gorillas in the Mist. At the trial, investigators said McGuire was not happy with his own research and wanted to use "any dishonest means possible" to complete his work. McGuire had returned to the United States in July 1987, and because no extradition treaty exists between the U.S. and Rwanda, McGuire did not return to Rwanda. His penalty was death by shooting.

Following his return to the U.S., McGuire gave a brief statement at a news conference in Century City, Los Angeles, saying Fossey had been his "friend and mentor", calling her death "tragic" and the charges "outrageous". Thereafter, McGuire was largely absent from public notice until 2005, when news broke that he had been accepted for a job with the Health and Human Services division of the State of Nebraska. The job offer was revoked upon discovery of his relation to the Fossey case.

Several subsequent books, including Farley Mowat's biography of Fossey, Woman in the Mists (New York, NY: Warner Books, 1987), have suggested alternative theories regarding her murder, including intimations that she may have been killed by financial interests linked to tourism or illicit trade. It has been alleged that Fossey had potentially damning evidence of gold-smugglers, hence the ransacked cabin.

A will purporting to be Fossey's bequeathed all of her estate (including the proceeds from the film Gorillas in the Mist) to the Digit Fund to underwrite anti-poaching patrols. Fossey did not mention her family in the will, which was unsigned. Her mother, Hazel Fossey Price, successfully challenged the will. New York State Supreme Court Justice Swartwood threw out the will and awarded the estate to her mother, including about $4.9 million in royalties from a recent book and upcoming movie, stating that the document "was simply a draft of her purported will and not a will at all." Price said she was working on a project to preserve the work her daughter had done for the mountain gorillas in Rwanda.<ref>AP News Report . (January 15, 1988). Ruling On Fossey's Will'</ref>

Personal life and views

During her African safari, Fossey met Alexie Forrester, the brother of a Rhodesian she had been dating in Louisville; Fossey and Forrester later became engaged. In her later years, Fossey became involved with National Geographic photographer Bob Campbell after a year of working together at Karisoke, with Campbell promising to leave his wife. Eventually the pair grew apart through her dedication to the gorillas and Karisoke, along with his need to work further afield and on his marriage. In 1970, studying for her Ph.D. at Darwin College, University of Cambridge, she discovered she was pregnant and had an abortion, later commenting that "you can't be a cover girl for National Geographic magazine and be pregnant." She graduated with a Doctor of Philosophy in Zoology in 1976. Fossey had other relationships throughout the years and always had a love for children. Since Fossey would rescue any abused or abandoned animal she saw in Africa or near Karisoke, she acquired a menagerie in the camp, including a monkey who lived in her cabin, Kima, and a dog, Cindy. Fossey held Christmas parties every year for her researchers, staffers, and their families, and she developed a genuine friendship with Jane Goodall.

Health
Fossey had been plagued by lung problems from an early age and, later in her life, suffered from advanced emphysema brought on by years of heavy cigarette smoking. As the debilitating disease progressed—further aggravated by the high mountain elevation and damp climate—Fossey found it increasingly difficult to conduct field research, frequently suffering from shortness of breath and requiring the help of an oxygen tank when climbing or hiking long distances.

Opposition to tourism
Fossey strongly opposed wildlife tourism, as gorillas are susceptible to human anthroponotic diseases like influenza from which they have limited immunity. Fossey reported several cases in which gorillas died because of diseases spread by tourists. She also viewed tourism as an interference into their natural wild behavior. Fossey also criticized tourist programs, often paid for by international conservation organizations, for interfering with both her research and the peace of the mountain gorillas' habitat, and was concerned that Jane Goodall was inappropriately changing her study of chimpanzees' behavior.

, the Dian Fossey Gorilla Fund International promotes tourism, which they say helps to create a stable and sustainable local community dedicated to protecting the gorillas and their habitat.

Legacy
After her death, Fossey's Digit Fund in the US was renamed the Dian Fossey Gorilla Fund International. The Karisoke Research Center is operated by the Dian Fossey Gorilla Fund International, and continues the daily gorilla monitoring and protection that she started.

Fossey is generally credited with reversing the downward trend in the mountain gorilla population. Due to poaching, gorilla populations declined from 450 in 1960 to just 250 in 1981. However, Fossey's "war on poaching" saw the final confirmed killing of a gorilla in 1983. By the late 1980s, the population had risen to 280. It continues to rise, as of 1987. Fossey's research, and the following publicity, spawned "gorilla tourism".

Between Fossey's death and the 1994 Rwandan genocide, Karisoke was directed by former students, some of whom had opposed her. During the genocide and subsequent period of insecurity, the camp was completely looted and destroyed. Today only remnants are left of her cabin. During the civil war, the Virunga National Park was filled with refugees, and illegal logging destroyed vast areas.

In 2014, the 82nd anniversary of Fossey's birth was commemorated by a Google Doodle.

In media and books
Universal Studios bought the film rights to Gorillas in the Mist from Fossey in 1985, and Warner Bros. Studios bought the rights to "the Dark Romance of Dian Fossey", a work by Harold T. P. Hayes, despite its having been severely criticized by Rosamond Carr. As a result of a legal battle between the two studios, a co-production was arranged. Portions of the story and the Hayes article were adapted for the film Gorillas in the Mist, starring Sigourney Weaver, Bryan Brown, and John Omirah Miluwi. The book covers Fossey's scientific career in great detail and omits material on her personal life, such as her affair with photographer Bob Campbell. In the film, the affair with Campbell (played by Bryan Brown) forms a major subplot. The Hayes article preceding the movie portrayed Fossey as a woman obsessed with gorillas, who would stop at nothing to protect them. The film includes scenes of Fossey's ruthless dealings with poachers, including a scene in which she sets fire to a poacher's home.

Fossey is considered a saint by the God's Gardeners, a fictional religious sect that is the focus of Margaret Atwood's 2009 novel The Year of the Flood.

In December 2017, Dian Fossey: Secrets in the Mist, a three-hour series, aired on the National Geographic Channel. The series tells the story of Fossey's life, work, murder and legacy, using archive footage and still images, interviews with people who knew and worked with her, specially shot footage, and reconstruction.

In A Forest in the Clouds: My Year Among the Mountain Gorillas in the Remote Enclave of Dian Fossey'' (Pegasus Books, 2018) John Fowler describes Fossey's remote mountain gorilla camp, Karisoke Research Center, a few years prior to her murder, telling the story of the unraveling of Fossey's Rwandan facility as pressures mount in an effort to extricate Fossey from her domain. Fowler represents Fossey as a chain-smoking, hard-drinking woman who bullied her staff and students in her efforts to hold onto to her reputation as scientist and savior of the mountain gorillas.

See also

 List of animal rights advocates
 List of unsolved murders
 The Trimates (Leakey's Ladies, Leakey's Angels)
 Birutė Galdikas
 Jane Goodall

Selected bibliography

Books

Scholarly articles

References

Citations

Works Cited

External links

Dian Fossey Gorilla Fund International
International Primate Protection League
Fossey's first article for National Geographic, 1970
Murder in the Mist solved? Animal Welfare Institute Quarterly
This article gives some information about the degradation of Dian's relationship with National Geographic Society prior to her death
Dian Fossey papers at the Sophia Smith Collection, Smith College Special Collections

1932 births
1985 deaths
1985 in Rwanda
20th-century American women scientists
20th-century American women writers
20th-century American zoologists
20th-century American anthropologists
1980s murders in Rwanda
1985 crimes in Rwanda
1985 murders in Africa
Alumni of Darwin College, Cambridge
American kidnappers
American mammalogists
American people murdered abroad
American science writers
American women anthropologists
Occupational therapists
American women non-fiction writers
College of Marin alumni
Deaths by blade weapons
Ethologists
Female murder victims
Activists from Kentucky
Kentucky women scientists
Environmental killings
People from San Francisco
People murdered in Rwanda
Primatologists
San Jose State University alumni
Scientists from California
University of California, Davis alumni
Unsolved murders in Rwanda
Women ethologists
Women mammalogists
Women primatologists
Writers about Africa
Writers from Louisville, Kentucky
Violence against women in Rwanda